In 783,  (姚令言), jiedushi of Jingyuan, and his 5,000 troops arrived in Chang'an (Xi'an, Shaanxi) on their way to fight Lǐ Xīliè (李希烈) in Henan. The troops mutinied in reaction to the poor treatment they had received, forcing Tang Dezong to flee Chang'an. After installing Zhū Cí (朱泚), an ousted general, as emperor, the rebels were defeated by Lǐ Shèng (李晟) in 784.

References

Mutinies
Rebellions in the Tang dynasty
783
Military history of Shaanxi